Iezărenii Vechi is a commune in Sîngerei District, Moldova. It is composed of two villages, Iezărenii Noi and Iezărenii Vechi.

References

Communes of Sîngerei District